Dezső Tandori (8 December 1938 – 13 February 2019) was a Hungarian writer, poet and literary translator. He was a member of the Széchenyi Academy of Literature and Arts and a founding member of the Digital Literature Academy. While publishing poetry and novels mainly under his own name, he also wrote detective fiction under the pseudonym Nat Roid.

Tandori was born into a family of officials. He completed his high school studies in Budapest, and in 1957 he received a degree in German language studies from Eötvös Lórand University. He then worked as a high school teacher for a short time. From 1971, Tandori earned his living as a freelance writer and translator. During his early career, he became acquainted with Ágnes Nemes Nagy, then a young grammar school teacher, and her literary circle (including Miklós Mészöly, Géta Ottlik, and Iván Mándy). Tandori adopted a reclusive lifestyle which became legendary in the 1970s and 1980s. In the 1990s, he began to travel, visiting Vienna, Paris, London, Copenhagen, and some German cities. During this period, he incorporated his experiences with Western horseracing and racetrack culture into his work.

Tandori's awards include the Kossuth Prize (1998) and the Attila József Prize (1978).

Tandori died on 13 February 2019 in Budapest at the age of 80.

References 

1938 births
2019 deaths
Hungarian male poets
Hungarian translators
Writers from Budapest
Attila József Prize recipients
20th-century Hungarian poets
20th-century Hungarian male writers
21st-century Hungarian poets
21st-century Hungarian male writers
20th-century translators